Computer science (also called computing science) is the study of the theoretical foundations of information and computation and their implementation and application in computer systems. One well known subject classification system for computer science is the ACM Computing Classification System devised by the Association for Computing Machinery.

Computer science can be described as all of the following:
 Academic discipline
 Science
 Applied science

Subfields

Mathematical foundations 

 Coding theory – Useful in networking, programming, system development, and other areas where computers communicate with each other.
 Game theory – Useful in artificial intelligence and cybernetics.
Discrete Mathematics
 Graph theory – Foundations for data structures and searching algorithms.
 Mathematical logic – Boolean logic and other ways of modeling logical queries; the uses and limitations of formal proof methods
 Number theory – Theory of the integers.  Used in cryptography as well as a test domain in artificial intelligence.

Algorithms and data structures 

 Algorithms – Sequential and parallel computational procedures for solving a wide range of problems.
 Data structures – The organization and manipulation of data.

Artificial intelligence 

Outline of artificial intelligence
 Artificial intelligence – The implementation and study of systems that exhibit an autonomous intelligence or behavior of their own.
  Automated reasoning – Solving engines, such as used in Prolog, which produce steps to a result given a query on a fact and rule database, and automated theorem provers that aim to prove mathematical theorems with some assistance from a programmer.
  Computer vision – Algorithms for identifying three-dimensional objects from a two-dimensional picture.
 Soft computing, the use of inexact solutions for otherwise extremely difficult problems:
 Machine learning - Development of models that are able to learn and adapt without following explicit instructions, by using algorithms and statistical models to analyse and draw inferences from patterns in data.
 Evolutionary computing - Biologically inspired algorithms.
  Natural language processing - Building systems and algorithms that analyze, understand, and generate natural (human) languages.
  Robotics – Algorithms for controlling the behaviour of robots.

Communication and security

  Networking – Algorithms and protocols for reliably communicating data across different shared or dedicated media, often including error correction.
  Computer security – Practical aspects of securing computer systems and computer networks.
  Cryptography – Applies results from complexity, probability, algebra and number theory to invent and break codes, and analyze the security of cryptographic protocols.

Computer architecture 

 Computer architecture – The design, organization, optimization and verification of a computer system, mostly about CPUs and Memory subsystem (and the bus connecting them).
  Operating systems – Systems for managing computer programs and providing the basis of a usable system.

Computer graphics 

  Computer graphics – Algorithms both for generating visual images synthetically, and for integrating or altering visual and spatial information sampled from the real world.
  Image processing – Determining information from an image through computation.
 Information visualization – Methods for representing and displaying abstract data to facilitate human interaction for exploration and understanding.

Concurrent, parallel, and distributed systems 

 Parallel computing - The theory and practice of simultaneous computation; data safety in any multitasking or multithreaded environment.
 Concurrency (computer science) – Computing using multiple concurrent threads of execution, devising algorithms for solving problems on multiple processors to achieve maximal speed-up compared to sequential execution.
 Distributed computing – Computing using multiple computing devices over a network to accomplish a common objective or task and thereby reducing the latency involved in single processor contributions for any task.

Databases 
Outline of databases
 Relational databases – the set theoretic and algorithmic foundation of databases.
 Structured Storage - non-relational databases such as NoSQL databases. 
 Data mining – Study of algorithms for searching and processing information in documents and databases; closely related to information retrieval.

Programming languages and compilers 

 Compiler theory – Theory of compiler design, based on Automata theory.
 Programming language pragmatics – Taxonomy of programming languages, their strength and weaknesses. Various programming paradigms, such as object-oriented programming.
 Programming language theory
 Formal semantics – rigorous mathematical study of the meaning of programs.
 Type theory – Formal analysis of the types of data, and the use of these types to understand properties of programs — especially program safety.

Scientific computing 
 Computational science – constructing mathematical models and quantitative analysis techniques and using computers to analyze and solve scientific problems.
 Numerical analysis – Approximate numerical solution of mathematical problems such as root-finding, integration, the solution of ordinary differential equations; the approximation of special functions.
 Symbolic computation – Manipulation and solution of expressions in symbolic form, also known as Computer algebra.
 Computational physics – Numerical simulations of large non-analytic systems
 Computational chemistry – Computational modelling of theoretical chemistry in order to determine chemical structures and properties
 Bioinformatics and Computational biology – The use of computer science to maintain, analyse, store biological data and to assist in solving biological problems such as Protein folding, function prediction and Phylogeny.
 Computational neuroscience – Computational modelling of neurophysiology.

Software engineering 
Outline of software engineering
 Formal methods – Mathematical approaches for describing and reasoning about software design.
 Software engineering – The principles and practice of designing, developing, and testing programs, as well as proper engineering practices.
  Algorithm design – Using ideas from algorithm theory to creatively design solutions to real tasks.
  Computer programming – The practice of using a programming language to implement algorithms.
  Human–computer interaction – The study and design of computer interfaces that people use.
 Reverse engineering – The application of the scientific method to the understanding of arbitrary existing software.

Theory of computation 

 Automata theory – Different logical structures for solving problems.
 Computability theory – What is calculable with the current models of computers. Proofs developed by Alan Turing and others provide insight into the possibilities of what may be computed and what may not.
 List of unsolved problems in computer science
 Computational complexity theory – Fundamental bounds (especially time and storage space) on classes of computations.
 Quantum computing theory – Explores computational models involving quantum superposition of bits.

History 

 History of computer science
 List of pioneers in computer science

Professions 
 Programmer (Software developer)
 Teacher/Professor
 Software engineer
 Software architect
 Software tester
 Hardware engineer
 Data analyst
 Interaction designer
 Network administrator
 Data scientist

Data and data structures
 Data structure
 Data type
 Associative array and Hash table
 Array
 List
 Tree
 String
 Matrix (computer science)
 Database

Programming paradigms

 Imperative programming/Procedural programming
 Functional programming
 Logic programming
 Object oriented programming
 Class
 Inheritance
 Object

See also 

 Abstraction
 Big O notation
 Closure
 Compiler
 Cognitive science

External links 

 
 ACM report on a recommended computer science curriculum (2008)
 Directory of free university lectures in Computer Science
 Collection of Computer Science Bibliographies
 Photographs of computer scientists (Bertrand Meyer's gallery)

Computer science
Computer science
Outline
Computer science topics